The Modern Jazz Quartet (MJQ) was a jazz combo established in 1952 that played music influenced by classical, cool jazz, blues and bebop. For most of its history the Quartet consisted of John Lewis (piano), Milt Jackson (vibraphone), Percy Heath (double bass), and Connie Kay (drums). The group grew out of the rhythm section of Dizzy Gillespie's big band from 1946 to 1948, which consisted of Lewis and Jackson along with bassist Ray Brown and drummer Kenny Clarke. They recorded as the Milt Jackson Quartet in 1951 and Brown left the group, being replaced on bass by Heath. During the early-to-mid-1950s they became the Modern Jazz Quartet, Lewis became the group's musical director, and they made several recordings with Prestige Records, including the original versions of their two best-known compositions, Lewis's "Django" and Jackson's "Bags' Groove". Clarke left the group in 1955 and was replaced as drummer by Connie Kay, and in 1956 they moved to Atlantic Records and made their first tour to Europe.

Under Lewis's direction, they carved their own niche by specializing in elegant, restrained music that used sophisticated counterpoint inspired by baroque music, yet nonetheless retained a strong blues feel. Noted for their elegant presentation, they were one of the first small jazz combos to perform in concert halls rather than nightclubs. They were initially active into the 1970s until Jackson quit in 1974 due to frustration with their finances and touring schedule, but re-formed in 1981. They made their last released recordings in 1992 and 1993, by which time Kay had been having health issues and Mickey Roker had been his replacement drummer while Kay was unavailable. After Kay's death in 1994, the group operated on a semi-active basis, with Percy Heath's brother Albert Heath on drums until the group disbanded permanently in 1997.

History

Background, formation, departure of Kenny Clarke, and Prestige recordings (1946–1955)
Two of the four founding members of the Modern Jazz Quartet, pianist John Lewis and drummer Kenny Clarke, met and first performed together in 1944 while stationed with the US army in France during World War II. In 1946, they reconnected in New York, where Clarke, who had joined his friend Dizzy Gillespie's big band, introduced Gillespie to Lewis, who went on to replace Thelonious Monk as the band's pianist. The band's rhythm section now consisted of Lewis (piano), Milt Jackson (vibraphone), Ray Brown (bass), and Clarke (drums). On Gillespie's encouragement, they began to perform improvised renditions of jazz standards as a standalone unit between sets of the big band's music, as an entr'acte, a practice that had been accepted in jazz since Benny Goodman introduced his trio in 1935. Jackson later recalled: "From the first time we performed in that band as a quartet, we became prominent and a part of the band. We would play fifteen to twenty minutes, two or three tunes, and everybody loved it, including Dizzy and the band." Upon the dissolution of Gillespie's band, the rhythm section considered continuing as a quartet under Jackson's name, but they went in their own directions for the next three years. On August 18, 1951, they made a recording as the Milt Jackson Quartet for Gillespie's record label, Dee Gee Records. Brown then left the group to concentrate on working with his wife, singer Ella Fitzgerald, and was replaced as bassist by Percy Heath, who had also performed with Gillespie. The quartet was incorporated on January 14, 1952, as the Modern Jazz Society, Inc., of which the Modern Jazz Quartet became the working entity. Three or four names were considered, including the New Jazz Quartet, before the group decided to use the name Modern Jazz Quartet. In a 1992 interview, Lewis said of the name: "It was an arbitrary name, the quickest name we could get cleared for a corporation in New York state. It had nothing to do with a description of the music." Heath later recalled a conversation between the group members that occurred in Jackson's Cadillac on the way home from a nightclub date that led up to the creation of the Modern Jazz Quartet:

In April 1952 they recorded for Hi-Lo Records as the Milt Jackson Quartet and also made a record for Blue Note Records with Lou Donaldson on saxophone as the Milt Jackson Quintet, later released on Wizard of the Vibes; the latter record contained the first recording of "Bags' Groove", which would become a signature song of the Modern Jazz Quartet. In November of that year they accompanied Charlie Parker in a live recording at Birdland. For Prestige Records, they made their first recordings as the Modern Jazz Quartet on December 22, 1952 which, on Prestige CEO Bob Weinstock's insistence, were released under the group name Milt Jackson and the Modern Jazz Quartet. These recordings contained the original version of Lewis's composition "Vendome", the Quartet's first experiment with combining jazz and fugal counterpoint. Between 1953 and early 1955 the group recorded the tracks that were eventually released on the album Django (1956), including their first recording of Lewis's composition "Django", another signature piece for the Quartet. In 1953 they also accompanied Ben Webster and Sonny Rollins on live recordings, the former being released in 2001 as 1953: An Exceptional Encounter. In October 1953, the Quartet began its first major booking at Birdland, which was followed by appearances in Boston, San Francisco, Los Angeles, Philadelphia, and Carnegie Hall. Reviewing their appearance at Birdland, Nat Hentoff wrote: "If the success of the Modern Jazz Quartet depended only on the support of jazz musicians, this could be the most in-demand unit in the country." Heath recalled:

In January 1955, they returned to Birdland, and on the last night of that engagement, Clarke announced that he was quitting the band. He later said that he did so because "I wouldn't be able to play the drums my way again after four or five years of playing eighteenth-century drawing-room jazz". Lewis recalled "He was trying to find himself. There was a change in the music, but it was early when Kenny left so it was easy to handle and adjust to. If we had to make the change later, it would have been a disaster. We had to give up a lot of pieces we played when Kenny left." Heath commented "It had to change, because there is no other Kenny Clarke. Kenny didn't want to have such orchestrated music because he was an innovator and didn't want his part dictated." Jackson said "The three years Kenny was in the group was an experimental stage. We were still looking for a direction." Monte Kay, who had by then become the group's manager, suggested that Clarke be replaced by Connie Kay (no relation), who joined the group the day after Clarke had left. The group members had come to have various responsibilities besides playing their instruments: Lewis was the musical director, Jackson handled public relations, Heath managed the finances, and Kay organized the accommodation and transportation. On July 2, 1955, the Modern Jazz Quartet recorded their last album with Prestige Records, Concorde; its title track was Lewis's second major fugue-influenced piece for the group.

Move to Atlantic Records and international success (1956–1974)

In 1956, the Modern Jazz Quartet moved to Atlantic Records, which was switching from singles to LPs and began focusing on jazz under the guidance of Nesuhi Ertegun, who signed the group to the company and worked with them as a producer. In that year, they recorded the album Fontessa and had their first formal collaboration with an invited guest, clarinetist Jimmy Giuffre, recorded as The Modern Jazz Quartet at Music Inn. In October of that year the Quartet took their first trip to Europe, where they recorded for South German Radio (SDR), performed on a month-long Birdland All-Star tour with Bud Powell, Miles Davis, and Lester Young, and had a two-week residency at Club Saint-Germain in Paris. The next year they came back to Europe on their own, performing 88 concerts in four months in Germany, France, and the British Isles, receiving rave reviews. In 1957, they also recorded a self-titled studio album, the live album The Modern Jazz Quartet and the Oscar Peterson Trio at the Opera House, and Lewis's first film soundtrack, for No Sun in Venice. The group recorded The Modern Jazz Quartet at Music Inn Volume 2 with Sonny Rollins in 1958 and 1959 saw Lewis's creation of the soundtrack for the film Odds Against Tomorrow, originally recorded with an orchestra and released in an arrangement for the Quartet as Music from Odds Against Tomorrow (1960). In 1960, they released Pyramid and European Concert, and contributed to the third stream movement with Third Stream Music (with Jimmy Giuffre 3) and The Modern Jazz Quartet & Orchestra. In 1962 they released The Comedy, containing a suite by Lewis inspired by characters from Commedia dell'arte, and Lonely Woman, whose title track was one of the first recorded covers of a composition by free jazz pioneer Ornette Coleman. They followed up with The Sheriff and Collaboration with guitarist Laurindo Almeida (1964), along with The Modern Jazz Quartet Plays George Gershwin's Porgy and Bess and Jazz Dialogue with the All Star Jazz Band (1965). They released a collaboration with the Swingle Singers, Place Vendôme (1966), and three live albums, Concert in Japan '66 (in Japan only), Blues at Carnegie Hall (1966), and Live at the Lighthouse (1967).

They then moved from Atlantic to Apple Records, for which they released Under the Jasmin Tree (1968) and Space (1969). Lewis, who produced these albums, recalled: "Monte Kay was a friend of the president of the Beatles' company, and he felt we weren't getting the attention we should have, so we went there and had two good records." Returning to Atlantic, they released Plastic Dreams (1971) and The Legendary Profile (1972). In 1973 they recorded the last two studio albums before their hiatus, In Memoriam (with an orchestra conducted by Maurice Peress) and Blues on Bach, both of which were released the next year). During this period, they performed annual Christmas concerts at the New York City Town Hall; a recording of performances from 1971 with Paul Desmond on saxophone was released in 1981.

Hiatus, reunion, and final years (1974–1997)

In July 1974, Jackson quit the group, later citing frustration with their finances as his primary reason. He was also unhappy with the group's touring schedule, which by then had become year-round rather than the previous arrangement in which they had vacations during the northern hemisphere summer. Jackson had previously used the downtime to play and record music that was not in the style of the Modern Jazz Quartet, but felt saddled in the group after they also began playing at summer jazz festivals around 1970. The jazz magazine DownBeat compared their breakup to "the abrupt disintegration of Mt. Rushmore". In November 1974 they performed a farewell concert at Avery Fisher Hall, later released as a series of two albums and then as a complete package, The Complete Last Concert (1988). They had occasional reunion concerts, never going more than eighteen months without playing together, before reuniting in 1981 for a tour of Japan, recorded as Reunion at Budokan 1981 for Pablo Records. They recorded three more albums for Pablo, Together Again: Live at the Montreux Jazz Festival '82 (1982), Echoes (1984), and Topsy: This One's for Basie (1985), before returning to Atlantic, recording Three Windows (1987, with the New York Chamber Symphony) and For Ellington (1988).

Kay had a stroke in 1992 and during his recovery was replaced by drummer Mickey Roker, who performed on some tracks on the group's last released recording, MJQ & Friends: A 40th Anniversary Celebration (recorded 1992–1993, released 1994). Kay died in November 1994, after which the group operated on a semi-active basis; the 1995 album Dedicated to Connie, a recording of a 1960 concert in Slovenia, was released in his memory. In February 1995, Albert Heath, Percy Heath's brother, became the quartet's percussionist. Percy Heath had become tired of touring by 1997 and the group permanently disbanded in that year after a final recording date. In October 1999, Jackson died, followed by Lewis in March 2001 and Heath in April 2005.

Style and public image
The Modern Jazz Quartet played in a cool jazz style that combined bebop and the blues with classical elements. There was a marked contrast in styles between Jackson's rhythmically complex blues-based solos and Lewis's restrained manner of playing and classically influenced pieces. One of the first small jazz combos to perform in concert halls rather than nightclubs, the group was noted for habitually wearing formal attire at concerts, inspired by the bands of Duke Ellington and Jimmie Lunceford. In his book Visions of Jazz, Gary Giddins summed up their legacy with an explanation of the jazz scene in 1992: "... Young bands customarily performed in concert and at festivals, often in tailored suits. Composition was as widely vaunted for small ensembles as improvisation, and flawless intonation was considered vital. Such traditional jazz devices as polyphony, riffs, breaks, boogie bass, mutes, and fugal counterpoint, as well as a repertory that ranges over the entire history of the music, were everywhere apparent. You could say that the Modern Jazz quartet now resided in a world at least partially of its own making."

Honors and legacy
The Modern Jazz Quartet earned a variety of honors, including the first NAACP award for cultural contributions in the field of music in 1957, top billing on numerous jazz magazine polls, and honorary doctorates from Berklee College. The Modern Folk Quartet, which was most active in the 1960s, took their name as a conscious parallel with the Modern Jazz Quartet.

Discography 
First dates are of recording, in parentheses are dates of release
 1952: The Modern Jazz Quartet Quintet recorded 1952 and 1954 (Prestige)
 1952 Wizard of the Vibes (10" LP issued 1952, 12" LP as Milt Jackson issued 1956) – session has identical personnel to the Modern Jazz Quartet of the time plus Lou Donaldson.
 1953: 1953: An Exceptional Encounter with Ben Webster (The Jazz Factory, 2001) – live
 1955: Concorde (Prestige, 1955)
 1953–55: Django (Prestige, 1956)
 1956: Fontessa (Atlantic, 1956)
 1956: The Modern Jazz Quartet at Music Inn with guest Jimmy Giuffre (Atlantic, 1956)
 1957: The Modern Jazz Quartet Plays No Sun in Venice (Atlantic, 1958) – soundtrack
 1957: The Modern Jazz Quartet (Atlantic, 1957)
 1957: The Modern Jazz Quartet and the Oscar Peterson Trio at the Opera House (Verve, 1957) – live
 1958: The Modern Jazz Quartet at Music Inn Volume 2 with Sonny Rollins (Atlantic, 1959) – live
 1959: Music from Odds Against Tomorrow (United Artists, 1959) – soundtrack also released as Patterns (United Artists, 1960)
 1959–60: Pyramid (Atlantic, 1960)
 1960: European Concert (Atlantic, 1960)[2LP] – live
 1960: Modern Jazz Quartet in Concert (Jazz Life, 1990)[2CD] – live recorded in Ljubljana. also released as Dedicated to Connie (Atlantic, 1995)[2CD].
 1960: The Modern Jazz Quartet & Orchestra (Atlantic, 1960)
 1960?: Third Stream Music with guests including the Jimmy Giuffre 3 (Atlantic, 1960)
 1962: The Comedy (Atlantic, 1962)
 1962: Lonely Woman (Atlantic, 1962)
 1963: 1963 Monterey Jazz Festival (Douglas, 1997) – live. also released as In a Crowd (Atlantic, 1998).
 1963: The Sheriff (Atlantic, 1964)
 1964: Collaboration with Laurindo Almeida (Atlantic, 1964)
 1964–65: The Modern Jazz Quartet Plays George Gershwin's Porgy and Bess (Atlantic, 1965)
 1965: Jazz Dialogue with The All Star Jazz Band (Atlantic, 1965)
 1966: Concert in Japan '66 (Atlantic, 1976)[2LP] – live. Japan only.
 1966: Blues at Carnegie Hall (Atlantic, 1966) – live
 1966: Place Vendôme with The Swingle Singers (Philips, 1966)
 1967: Live at the Lighthouse (Atlantic, 1967) – live
 1967: Under the Jasmin Tree (Apple, 1968)
 1969: Space (Apple, 1969)
 1971: Plastic Dreams (Atlantic, 1971)
 1971: The Only Recorded Performance of Paul Desmond With The Modern Jazz Quartet with Paul Desmond (Finesse/Columbia, 1981)
 1972: The Legendary Profile (Atlantic1972)
 1973: In Memoriam (Little David, 1974)
 1973: Blues on Bach (Atlantic, 1974)
 1974: The Complete Last Concert (Atlantic, 1988)[2CD] – includes live The Last Concert (1975)[2LP] and More from the Last Concert (1981)
 1981: Reunion at Budokan 1981 (Pablo, 1981) – live
 1982: Together Again: Live at the Montreux Jazz Festival '82 (Pablo, 1982) – live
 1984: Echoes (Pablo, 1984)
 1985: Topsy: This One's for Basie (Pablo, 1985)
 1987: Three Windows (Atlantic, 1987)
 1988: For Ellington (East West, 1988)
 1992: A Night at the Opera (Jazz Door, 1994) – unofficial
 1992–93: MJQ & Friends: A 40th Anniversary Celebration (Atlantic, 1994)

Compilations 
Dates are of first release.
 Plays for Lovers (Prestige, 1960)
 The Modern Jazz Quartet (Prestige, 1972)[2LP]
 The Art of The Modern Jazz Quartet – The Atlantic Years (Atlantic, 1973)
 A Proper Introduction to the Modern Jazz Quartet: La Ronde (Past Perfect, 2002)
 The Complete Modern Jazz Quartet Prestige & Pablo Recordings (Prestige/Pablo/Fantasy, 2003)[4CD]
 The Modern Jazz Quartet & Jimmy Giuffre – Complete Recordings (Lone Hill, 2005)
 The MJQ in the Movies (Giant Steps, 2010)
 The Complete Atlantic Studio Recordings of The Modern Jazz Quartet 1956–64 (Mosaic, 2011)[7CD]
 Original Album Series – The Modern Jazz Quartet (Warner, 2012)[5CD]

Filmography
 2005: The Modern Jazz Quartet: 35th Anniversary Tour
 2007: 40 Years of MJQ
 2008: Django

References

Further reading

External links
more about MJQ and recordings

Jazz fusion ensembles
Bebop ensembles
Cool jazz ensembles
Musical quartets
African-American musical groups
Atlantic Records artists
Apple Records artists
Prestige Records artists
American jazz ensembles from New York City
Musical groups established in 1952
Musical groups disestablished in 1997
1952 establishments in the United States
1997 disestablishments in the United States